Pueblo is a term primarily used in Puerto Rico to refer to the municipal district (barrio) that serves as the administrative, historic and cultural center of a municipality. The concept of pueblo is often used locally as analogous to the concept of downtown in U.S. cities. Pueblos are officially called barrio-pueblo by the United States Census since 1990.

Overview 

The Spanish word pueblo translates to town in English, since many of these correspond to the original European-founded settlements in their respective contemporary municipalities; however, its usage in Puerto Rican Spanish today corresponds more closely to the concept of downtown in English. In some cases, the concept of pueblo might also refer to municipality, but the term municipality never applies to pueblos. With a few exceptions, the barrio-pueblo is also the historic district of the municipality and usually contains the main town square (plaza, and in some cases, plaza de armas) surrounded by the municipal administrative buildings (alcaldía) and the main Catholic church in town (either a cathedral or parish church).

The central plaza or square, is a place for official and unofficial recreational events and a place where people can gather and socialize. The Laws of the Indies, the Spanish law which regulated life in Puerto Rico in the early 19th century, stated the plaza's purpose was for celebrations and festivities, most notably the town patron saint festivals (fiestas patronales), and that the square should be proportionally large enough for the number of neighbors. These Spanish regulations also stated that the streets nearby should be comfortable portals for passersby, protecting them from the elements: sun and rain. 

As of the 2010 census, Mayagüez is the most populated pueblo in Puerto Rico with a population of 26,903, while Las Marías has the lowest population with 262 inhabitants. The largest barrio-pueblo in Puerto Rico is Fajardo with a total area of 3.23 square miles, while Toa Alta is the smallest with an area of 0.03 square miles.

Exceptions 
Although all barrio-pueblos correspond to the administrative and downtown area of Puerto Rican municipalities, some barrios and clusters of barrios (such as in Ponce) also function and are categorized as the pueblos of their respective municipalities. The municipality of San Juan is a good example of this: the barrios Pueblo and San Juan Antiguo correspond to the pueblos of the former municipalities of Río Piedras and San Juan (pre-1951). Both of these contained a main town square or plaza de armas with a city hall and a church. When San Juan and Río Piedras merged into a single municipality in 1951, the former pueblo of Río Piedras retained its name. Florida and Ponce are the two other municipalities in Puerto Rico that do not contain a designated barrio-pueblo. The exception of Florida is due to the fact that the municipality has no barrios, while Ponce does not have a single designated barrio-pueblo but six barrios that correspond to the pueblo of Ponce.

The name of the pueblo almost always is the name as the municipality is located in. For example, the barrio-pueblo of the municipality of Caguas is also called Caguas (Pueblo de Caguas). The exception to this occurs with the island municipalities of Culebra and Vieques. Although the barrio-pueblo of Culebra is known as Culebra (Pueblo de Culebra) today, its former name used to be Dewey, while the name of the barrio-pueblo of Vieques today remains Isabel II. Both of these are also the main settlements of the islands they are located in.

History 

Although the urban zones that today are designated as barrio-pueblo have existed since the Spanish colonization of Puerto Rico, the concept of barrio was first used in the island during the 19th century. Historians have speculated the creation of barrios as administrative units may have been related to the Puerto Rican representation at the Cortes of Cádiz. All municipalities in the island had a distinct barrio officially called pueblo (this is where the contemporary usage of pueblo in Puerto Rico comes from). Many of these pueblos used to have a certain degree of autonomy and local governance in the form of councils. Today barrios and barrio-pueblos have no political autonomy, and their designation is now for statistical and municipal management purposes. In 1980, they were still referred to as pueblos on the US Census. Beginning with the 1990 census, these pueblos have been officially referred to as barrio-pueblos by the United States Census Bureau.

List of Pueblos 
The following list includes all barrio-pueblos and equivalent barrios in Puerto Rico. The municipality of Florida is not included in the list as it has no barrios nor barrio-pueblos. Ponce today has no official barrio-pueblo designations, however six of its barrios (all given cardinal names, i.e., 'first', 'second', 'sixth') correspond to the original core equivalent to the concept of barrio-pueblo today. The municipality of San Juan today, originally consisted of two separate municipalities with a barrio-pueblo each: San Juan Antiguo for the municipality of San Juan, and Pueblo for the former municipality of Río Piedras.

In pop culture 
The song "Me voy pa'l pueblo" by El Trío Los Panchos sings of going to the pueblo.

Gallery

See also 

 Barrios of Puerto Rico
 Municipalities of Puerto Rico

References 

Administrative divisions in North America
Populated places in Puerto Rico